The Torneo de Promoción y Reserva is a football tournament in Peru. There are currently 16 clubs in the league. It will play from the year 2010 in a simultaneous way and preliminary to the Torneo Descentralizado among the 16 teams of first division. Each team will have in staff to twelve 21-year-old players, three of 19 and three experienced; whenever they be recorded in the club. The team champion in this tournament will offer two points and the runner-up a point of bonus to the respective regular team in the 2010 Torneo Descentralizado.

Clubs

Standings

Results

Second Place playoff

Top goalscorers
14 goals
 Francesco Recalde (Universidad César Vallejo)
 Diago Portugal (Alianza Lima)
12 goals
 Franco Navarro (Sporting Cristal)
 Javier Carnero(Melgar)
11 goals
 Fernando García (Juan Aurich)
10 goals
 Christian Carranza (Universidad César Vallejo)
9 goals
 Diego Pizarro (Sport Boys)
 Hans Bardales (Total Chalaco)
 André Carrillo (Alianza Lima)
 Robert Tarrillo (Alianza Lima)

References

External links
 Así se jugará el campeonato peruano
 Blog del Torneo de Promoción y Reservas

Res
2010